Shevardeni Stadium is the home field for the Georgia rugby union national team. It consists of two full-size rugby pitches, one each with artificial and natural turf. The natural pitch is used for Georgian Rugby premiership Supreme league club games, and the artificial field is used for Georgian premiership first league club games. 

Football venues in Tbilisi
Sports venues in Tbilisi